An election to Leicestershire County Council took place on 2 May 2013 as part of the 2013 United Kingdom local elections. 55 councillors were elected from 52 electoral divisions, which returned either one or two county councillors each by first-past-the-post voting for a four-year term of office. The Conservatives held control of the council with a reduced majority of 5 seats. Despite a strong challenge from UKIP, the party only gained 2 seats (including one where the sitting Conservative councillor had previously defected to UKIP) whilst the Liberal Democrats lost one seat and Labour recouped some of their 2009 losses, gaining 6 seats.

All locally registered electors (British, Irish, Commonwealth and European Union citizens) who were aged 18 or over on Thursday 2 May 2013 were entitled to vote in the local elections. Those who were temporarily away from their ordinary address (for example, away working, on holiday, in student accommodation or in hospital) were also entitled to vote in the local elections, although those who had moved abroad and registered as overseas electors cannot vote in the local elections. It is possible to register to vote at more than one address (such as a university student who had a term-time address and lives at home during holidays) at the discretion of the local Electoral Register Office, but it remains an offence to vote more than once in the same local government election.

Results

|}

Results by electoral division
Results for individual divisions are shown below. They have been divided into their respective Districts or Boroughs and listed alphabetically.

District of Blaby
(8 seats, 8 Electoral Divisions)

Borough of Charnwood
(14 seats, 14 Electoral Divisions)

District of Harborough
(7 seats, 7 Electoral Divisions)

Borough of Hinckley and Bosworth
(9 seats, 7 Electoral Divisions)

Borough of Melton
(4 seats, 4 Electoral Divisions)

District of North West Leicestershire
(8 seats, 8 Electoral Divisions)

^ The sitting councillor Graham Partner had previously defected from the BNP to the newly formed British Democratic Party and so his vote share changes reflect the result he achieved in 2009.

Borough of Oadby and Wigston
(5 seats, 4 Electoral Divisions)

References

2013 English local elections
2013
2010s in Leicestershire